Darren Antony Pratley (born 22 April 1985) is an English professional footballer who plays as a midfielder for League Two club Leyton Orient as club captain.

Club career

Fulham
Starting his career at Fulham after signing from local rivals Arsenal, Pratley signed his first professional contract with the club in 2002. Pratley made his debut in a League Cup match at Wigan Athletic on 23 September 2003, coming on as a substitute for Andrejs Stolcers. He made his league debut against Charlton Athletic on 8 November 2003, again as a substitute, this time for Barry Hayles. These turned out to be the only two matches he would play for Fulham. At the end of the 2003–04 season, Pratley signed a two-year contract with the club, which will keep him until 2006. On 8 June 2006, he was sold by Fulham to Swansea City for a fee of £100,000.

Brentford (loans)

Having spent the latter parts of the 2004–05 season on loan at Brentford, on 30 August 2005 Pratley moved back to the Bees until January 2006 on a loan period that was subsequently extended until the end of the 2005–06 season.

Swansea City
On 7 November 2009, Pratley scored a brace against their arch-rivals Cardiff City. Pratley had not scored for 26 matches since the previous season's corresponding fixture at the Liberty Stadium but he proved Swansea's hero on the hour to seal the win. Pratley went on to score a further three times before the end of 2009, against Sheffield Wednesday (twice) and Reading. He started off the 2010–11 season well, however a string of poor performances saw him dropped by manager Brendan Rodgers. Pratley came back into the team performing well and getting vital goals against Reading, Crystal Palace a double against Bristol City and the third goal in the Championship play-off semi-final second leg against Nottingham Forest which he scored from the halfway-line into an empty goal. On 9 June 2011, it was confirmed that Pratley would leave Swansea City having rejected a new contract.

Bolton Wanderers
Pratley signed for Bolton Wanderers on 1 July 2011 on a four-year deal. He made his debut when coming on as a substitute for Nigel Reo-Coker in Bolton's match at Queens Park Rangers on 13 August and scored his first goal for the club in their 2–1 victory over his former club Swansea City in the FA Cup on 28 January 2012. He scored his first Premier League goal in the match against Queens Park Rangers at the Reebok Stadium on 10 March in Bolton's 2–1 win. On 3 August 2013, the first day of the 2013–14 season, Pratley scored the equaliser in a 1–1 draw with Burnley. He then also scored in a 1–1 draw with Reading a week later. On 1 July 2015, Pratley signed a new-three-year contract that will keep him at Bolton Wanderers until the summer of 2018.

A few weeks later Pratley was appointed as the new club captain of Bolton, replacing Matt Mills who had departed earlier that summer for Nottingham Forest. He played the first match of the 2016–17 season, picking up an injury that ruled him out for seven months. When he was due to return in January, a further setback ruled him out for the rest of the season. Pratley managed to return earlier than expected and started in Bolton's 4–2 win over Fleetwood Town on 11 March. He was released by Bolton at the end of the 2017–18 season.

Charlton Athletic
On 17 July 2018, Pratley signed a two-year deal with Charlton Athletic. In the 2018/19 League One season, Pratley played an important part in Charlton's playoff promotion winning campaign, scoring a crucial late goal in the Playoff Semi-final against Doncaster Rovers. At the end of the 2020/21 season, Pratley was not offered a new contract .

On 18 May 2021, it was announced that Pratley would leave Charlton Athletic at the end of his contract.

Leyton Orient
On 9 June 2021, Pratley agreed to join League Two side Leyton Orient, signing a one-year deal with the club active from the end of his contract with Charlton. Having previously worked with manager Kenny Jackett at Swansea City, Pratley was appointed captain.

International career
On 16 January 2009, Pratley was called up to the Jamaican squad by coach John Barnes to face Nigeria on 11 February 2009. Pratley qualifies for Jamaica through his grandparents but is yet to represent the Reggae Boyz after pulling out of the squad for the Nigeria friendly through injury after he broke his shoulder in a 4–1 win over Preston North End, although he did return earlier than expected from his injury.

Career statistics

Honours
Swansea City
Football League One: 2007–08
Football League Championship play-offs: 2011

Bolton Wanderers
EFL League One runner-up: 2016–17

Charlton Athletic
EFL League One play-offs: 2019

References

External links

Darren Pratley on the Bolton F.C. website

1985 births
Living people
Footballers from Barking, London
English footballers
Association football midfielders
Fulham F.C. players
Brentford F.C. players
Swansea City A.F.C. players
Bolton Wanderers F.C. players
Charlton Athletic F.C. players
Leyton Orient F.C. players
Premier League players
English Football League players
English people of Jamaican descent